Carl Deuker (born August 26, 1950) is an author of young adult novels.

Early life and education

Career

His first novel, On the Devil's Court, was published in 1989.  Deuker's next book was Heart of a Champion.

Other books
 Painting the black (Houghton Mifflin, 1997) 
 Night Hoops (Houghton Mifflin, 2000) 
 High Heat (Houghton Mifflin, 2003) 
 Gym Candy (Houghton Mifflin, 2007) 
 Payback time (Houghton Mifflin Harcourt, 2010)

Awards

References 

American writers of young adult literature
Living people
1950 births